The Best Years of Our Lives (also known as Glory for Me and Home Again) is a 1946 American epic drama film directed by William Wyler and starring Myrna Loy, Fredric March, Dana Andrews, Teresa Wright, Virginia Mayo and Harold Russell. The film is about three United States servicemen re-adjusting to societal changes and civilian life after coming home from World War II. The three men come from different services with different ranks that do not correspond with their civilian social class backgrounds.

The film was a critical and commercial success. It won seven Academy Awards: Best Picture, Best Director (William Wyler), Best Actor (Fredric March), Best Supporting Actor (Harold Russell), Best Film Editing (Daniel Mandell), Best Adapted Screenplay (Robert E. Sherwood), and Best Original Score (Hugo Friedhofer). 

In addition, Russell was also awarded an honorary Academy Award, the only time in history that two such awards were given for a single performance.

It was the highest-grossing film in both the United States and United Kingdom since the release of Gone with the Wind, and is the sixth most-attended film of all time in the United Kingdom, with over 20 million tickets sold.

In 1989, The Best Years of Our Lives was one of the first 25 films selected by the Library of Congress for preservation in the United States National Film Registry for being "culturally, historically, or aesthetically significant".

Plot 
 
At the end of World War II, three veterans - (USAAF bombardier captain Fred Derry, U.S. Navy petty officer Homer Parrish, and U.S. Army sergeant Al Stephenson) - meet on a flight to their midwestern hometown of Boone City.

Before the war, Fred was a drug store soda jerk who lived with his parents in the poorer part of town.  Shortly before shipping out, Fred married Marie after a whirlwind romance; she has since been working in a nightclub, and enjoyed the extra income that Fred's military pay afforded her, without much thought to her husband.  Al worked as an officer at the local bank and lived in an upscale apartment with his wife, Millie, and their children, Peggy and Rob. Homer was a star high school athlete living with his middle-class parents and younger sister. Homer had also been dating his next-door neighbor, Wilma, committed to marrying upon his return.

Each man faces challenges integrating back into civilian life. Homer lost both hands in the war and though he has become quite functional in the use of his mechanical hooks, he cannot believe that Wilma will still want to marry him. Al, tired and jaded from the war, returns to the bank and is given a promotion, but wrestles with alcohol. Though highly decorated, Fred suffers from PTSD flashbacks by night, is unable to find a better job than soda jerk and returns to the same drug store. 

Fred and Peggy develop an attraction for each other, which ultimately puts the married Fred at odds with Al. Although proficient in managing the challenges of his disability, Homer is frustrated by his loss of independence and adjusting to his relationship with Wilma, who loyally remains by his side. Al continues to struggle with re-entry into normal life. Widely respected by the bank's senior management for his past business acumen, Al approves an unsecured loan to a farmer and fellow veteran. His behavior is made worse by his excessive drinking.

All three characters' individual stories come to a head. When Homer visits Fred at the drug store, another customer criticizes U.S. involvement in the war and tells Homer his injuries were not necessary. Homer responds in anger, and Fred intervenes on Homer's behalf, punching the customer and then being fired for it. Meanwhile, Fred's wife, Marie, frustrated with his lack of financial success and missing her past nightlife, tells Fred she is getting a divorce.  Bitter, and seeing no future in Boone City, particularly with Al telling Fred to stay away from Peggy, Fred decides to pack up and catch the next plane out.  While waiting at the airport, Fred walks into an aircraft boneyard, where he climbs into one of the decommissioned B-17 bombers. Sitting in the bombardier's seat, Fred has another flashback. He is roused out of his stressful memories by a work crew foreman, who informs him that the planes are being demolished for use in the growing pre-fab housing industry. Fred asks him if they need any help in the budding business, and is hired.

Al, Millie, and Peggy attend Homer's and Wilma's wedding, where Fred is best man. Now divorced, Fred reunites with Peggy after the ceremony. Fred expresses his love but tells her things may be financially difficult if she stays with him. Peggy's smile makes it clear she will remain committed to Fred.

Cast 

Casting brought together established stars as well as character actors and relative unknowns. The jazz drummer Gene Krupa was seen in archival footage, while Tennessee Ernie Ford, later a television star, appeared as an uncredited "hillbilly singer" (in the first of his only three film appearances). Blake Edwards, later a film producer and director, appeared fleetingly as an uncredited "Corporal". Wyler's daughters, Catherine and Judy, were cast as uncredited customers seen in the drug store where Fred Derry works. Sean Penn's father, Leo, played the uncredited part of the soldier working as the scheduling clerk in the Air Transport Command Office at the beginning of the film.

Teresa Wright was only thirteen years younger than her on-screen mother, played by Myrna Loy. Michael Hall (1926-2020), at the time of his death the last surviving credited cast member, with his role as Fredric March's on-screen son, is absent after the first third of the film. The reason was that Hall's contract with Goldwyn ended during filming, but the producer was reluctant to pay extra money to rehire him.

Production 
Samuel Goldwyn was inspired to produce a film about veterans after reading an August 7, 1944, article in Time about the difficulties experienced by men returning to civilian life. Goldwyn hired former war correspondent MacKinlay Kantor to write a screenplay. His work was first published as a novella, Glory for Me, which Kantor wrote in blank verse. Robert E. Sherwood then adapted the novella as a screenplay.

Director Wyler had flown combat missions over Europe in filming Memphis Belle (1944), and worked hard to get accurate depictions of the combat veterans he had encountered. Wyler changed the original casting, which had featured a veteran suffering from post-traumatic stress disorder, and sought out Harold Russell, a non-actor, to take on the exacting role of Homer Parrish.

For The Best Years of Our Lives, he asked the principal actors to purchase their own clothes, in order to connect with daily life and produce an authentic feeling. Other Wyler touches included constructing life-size sets, which went against the standard larger sets that were more suited to camera positions. The impact for the audience was immediate, as each scene played out in a realistic, natural way.

Recounting the interrelated story of three veterans right after the end of World War II, The Best Years of Our Lives began filming just over seven months after the war's end, starting on April 15, 1946 at a variety of locations, including the Los Angeles County Arboretum and Botanic Garden, Ontario International Airport in Ontario, California, Raleigh Studios in Hollywood, and the Samuel Goldwyn/Warner Hollywood Studios.

In The Best Years of Our Lives cinematographer Gregg Toland used deep focus photography, in which objects both close to and distant from the camera are in sharp focus. For the passage of Fred Derry's reliving a combat mission while sitting in the remains of a former bomber, Wyler used "zoom" effects to simulate Derry's subjective state.

The fictional Boone City was patterned after Cincinnati, Ohio. The "Jackson High" football stadium seen early in aerial footage of the bomber flying over the Boone City, is Corcoran Stadium located at Xavier University in Cincinnati. A few seconds later Walnut Hills High School with its dome and football field can be seen along with the downtown Cincinnati skyline (Carew Tower and Fourth and Vine Tower) in the background.

After the war, the combat aircraft featured in the film were being destroyed and disassembled for reuse as scrap material. The scene of Derry's walking among aircraft ruins was filmed at the Ontario Army Air Field in Ontario, California. The former training facility had been converted into a scrap yard, housing nearly 2,000 former combat aircraft in various states of disassembly and reclamation.

Reception

Critical response 
Upon its release, The Best Years of Our Lives received extremely positive reviews from critics. Shortly after its premiere at the Astor Theater, New York, Bosley Crowther, film critic for The New York Times, hailed the film as a masterpiece. He wrote,

French film critic André Bazin used examples of Toland's and Wyler's deep-focus visual style to illuminate his theory of realism in filmgoing into detail about the scene in which Fred uses the phone booth in the far background while Homer and Butch play piano in the foreground. Bazin explains how deep focus functions in this scene:

Professor and author Gabriel Miller discusses briefly the use of deep-focus in both the bar scene and the wedding scene at the end of the picture in an article written for the National Film Preservation Board.

Several decades later, film critic David Thomson offered tempered praise: "I would concede that Best Years is decent and humane... acutely observed, despite being so meticulous a package. It would have taken uncommon genius and daring at that time to sneak a view of an untidy or unresolved America past Goldwyn or the public."

The Best Years of Our Lives has a 97% "Fresh" rating at Rotten Tomatoes, with an average rating of 8.9/10, based on 96 reviews. The critical consensus states: "An engrossing look at the triumphs and travails of war veterans, The Best Years of Our Lives is concerned specifically with the aftermath of World War II, but its messages speak to the overall American experience." Chicago Sun Times film critic Roger Ebert put the film on his "Great Movies" list in 2007, calling it "... modern, lean, and honest".

Popular response 
The Best Years of Our Lives was a massive commercial success, earning an estimated $10.2 million at the U.S. and Canadian box office during its initial theatrical run, not only making it the highest-grossing film of 1946, but also the highest-grossing film of the 1940s decade. It benefited from much larger admission prices than the majority of films released that year which accounted for almost 70% of its earnings. When box office figures are adjusted for inflation, it remains one of the top 100 grossing films in U.S. history.

Among films released before 1950, only Gone With the Wind, The Bells of St. Mary's, The Big Parade and four Disney titles have done more total business, in part due to later re-releases. (Reliable box office figures for certain early films such as The Birth of a Nation and Charlie Chaplin's comedies are unavailable.)

However, because of the distribution arrangement RKO had with Goldwyn, RKO recorded a loss of $660,000 on the film.

Russell Academy Award 
Despite his Oscar-nominated performance, Harold Russell was not a professional actor. As the Academy Board of Governors considered him a long shot to win, they gave him an Academy Honorary Award "for bringing hope and courage to his fellow veterans through his appearance". When Russell in fact won Best Supporting Actor, there was an enthusiastic response. He is the only actor to have received two Academy Awards for the same performance. In 1992, Russell sold his Best Supporting Actor statuette at auction for $60,500 ($ today), to pay his wife's medical bills.

In 1989, the film was selected for preservation in the United States National Film Registry by the Library of Congress as being "culturally, historically, or aesthetically significant".

American Film Institute included the film as #37 in its 1998 AFI's 100 Years... 100 Movies, as #11 in its 2006 AFI's 100 Years... 100 Cheers, and as #37 in its 2007 AFI's 100 Years... 100 Movies (10th Anniversary Edition).

Radio adaptations
In 1947 and 1949, there were four separate half-hour adaptations from Hedda Hopper's This Is Hollywood, Screen Guild Theater (two) and Screen Directors Playhouse. In all four cases, various actors reprised their film roles.

References

Notes

Citations

Sources 

 Dolan, Edward F. Jr. Hollywood Goes to War. London: Bison Books, 1985. .
 Eagan, Daniel. The Best Years of Our Lives, in America's Film Legacy: The Authoritative Guide to the Landmark Movies in the National Film Registry. A&C Black, 2010 , pp. 399–401.
 Flood, Richard. "Reel crank – critic Manny Farber." Artforum, Volume 37, Issue 1, September 1998. .
 Hardwick, Jack and Ed Schnepf. "A Viewer's Guide to Aviation Movies", in The Making of the Great Aviation Films. General Aviation Series, Volume 2, 1989.
 Kinn, Gail and Jim Piazza. The Academy Awards: The Complete Unofficial History. New York: Black Dog & Leventhal, 2008. .
 Orriss, Bruce. When Hollywood Ruled the Skies: The Aviation Film Classics of World War II. Hawthorn, California: Aero Associates Inc., 1984. ; .
 Thomson, David. Showman: The Life of David O. Selznick. London: Abacus, 1993. .
 Thomson, David. "Wyler, William". The New Biographical Dictionary of Film. 4th Edition. London: Little, Brown, 2002. .
 Tibbetts, John C., and James M. Welsh, eds. The Encyclopedia of Novels Into Film (2nd ed. 2005) pp. 152–153.

External links 

 
 
 The Best Years of Our Lives at Filmsite.org
 The Best Years of Our Lives at Reel Classics
 
 The Best Years of Our Lives at National Film Registry
 
 The Best Years of Our Lives at American Music Preservation
 

Streaming audio
 The Best Years of Our Lives on Screen Guild Theater: November 24, 1947
 The Best Years of Our Lives on Screen Directors Playhouse: April 17, 1949

1946 films
1940s English-language films
1940s war drama films
American aviation films
American black-and-white films
American war drama films
Best Drama Picture Golden Globe winners
Best Film BAFTA Award winners
Best Picture Academy Award winners
Films about veterans
Films about disability in the United States
Films about amputees
Films about post-traumatic stress disorder
Films about marriage
Films about weddings
Films based on American novels
Films based on military novels
Films based on works by MacKinlay Kantor
Films directed by William Wyler
Films featuring a Best Actor Academy Award-winning performance
Films featuring a Best Supporting Actor Academy Award-winning performance
Films scored by Hugo Friedhofer
Films that won the Best Original Score Academy Award
Films whose director won the Best Directing Academy Award
Films whose editor won the Best Film Editing Academy Award
Films whose writer won the Best Adapted Screenplay Academy Award
RKO Pictures films
Samuel Goldwyn Productions films
United States National Film Registry films
American World War II films
1946 drama films
1940s American films
Films about disability